Fuente el Sol is a municipality located in the province of Valladolid, Castile and León, Spain.

According to the 2004 census (INE), the municipality had a population of 278 inhabitants.

See also
Fuente el Sol is also the name of a street and a park in the city of Valladolid.

References

Municipalities in the Province of Valladolid